Book of Rejection was the second album by Canadian folk rock group Leslie Spit Treeo, released in 1992 on Capitol-EMI Canada.

The album's two main singles were "In Your Eyes" and "People Say". "In Your Eyes", the band's biggest hit, reached the Top 20 on the Canadian charts in the fall of 1992.

Guest musicians on the album included Jason Sniderman, Randy Bachman and the album's producer, Chris Wardman.

Track listing

 Angry Lifetime (4:24)
 Too Easy Now (2:31)
 Happy (3:57)
 River Through My Fire (3:35)
 In Your Eyes (3:22)
 Book of Rejection (5:23)
 Be a Clown (4:46)
 What If (3:34)
 People Say (4:01)
 Sometimes I Wish (3:04)
 Redirected (4:20)
 She's a Slut (3:46)
 Little Dog (2:56)
 Falling Star (3:16)

1992 albums
Leslie Spit Treeo albums